Alfred "Fredy" Bachmann (born 31 March 1945) is a Swiss retired rower. With Heinrich Fischer, he won the silver medal in the coxless pairs event at the 1972 Summer Olympics.

References

External links
 
 
 

1945 births
Living people
Swiss male rowers
Olympic rowers of Switzerland
Rowers at the 1972 Summer Olympics
Olympic silver medalists for Switzerland
Olympic medalists in rowing
Medalists at the 1972 Summer Olympics